Yury Ivanov or Yuri Ivanov may refer to
People
Yury Ivanov (fencer) (born 1935), Soviet Olympic fencer
Yury Ivanov (ski jumper) (born 1952), Soviet Olympic ski jumper
Yuri Ivanov (military) (1957–2010), Russian military official 
Yuri Ivanov (footballer, born 1960), Russian footballer
Yury Ivanov (footballer, born 1972), Kazakhstani footballer
Yuri Ivanov (footballer, born 1982), Bulgarian footballer
Yuri Ivanov (serial killer), serial killer
Yuri Ivanov (speedway rider) (born 1959), Soviet speedway rider

Other
Yury Ivanov-class intelligence ship